Orlando Moraes Luz (born 8 February 1998 in Carazinho) is a Brazilian tennis player. He has a career-high singles ranking of world No. 272 achieved on 16 August 2021, and a career-high doubles ranking of world No. 90 achieved on 27 September 2021.

Juniors
Luz along with Marcelo Zormann won the 2014 Wimbledon boys' doubles title after defeating Stefan Kozlov and Andrey Rublev 6–4, 3–6, 8–6 in the final.

At the 2014 Summer Youth Olympics held in Nanjing China,  Luz (seeded 2nd) won the silver medal in singles, falling to Kamil Majchrzak of Poland 4–6, 5–7 in the final. Additionally, he and compatriot Marcelo Zormann teamed up to win the gold medal in doubles, defeating the Russian pairing of Andrey Rublev and Karen Khachanov  7–5, 3–6, [10–3] in the final also seeded second.

He and Chung Yun-seong lost to Yishai Oliel of Israel and Patrik Rikl of the Czech Republic in the final of the 2016 French Open Boys' Doubles tournament, 6–3, 6–4.

Professional career 
Luz made his ATP singles debut on 6 March 2017, when he was given a wildcard to the first round of the Brasil Open. He was defeated by Gastão Elias 2–6, 5–7.

At the 2020 Rio Open, Luz alongside Rafael Matos defeated the 2019 Wimbledon and 2019 US Open champions, and ATP doubles World No. 1, Juan Sebastián Cabal and Robert Farah 6–1, 4–6, [10–8].

ATP Challenger and ITF Futures finals

Singles: 21 (8–13)

Doubles: 49 (36–13)

Junior Grand Slam finals

Doubles: 1 (1 title, 1 runner-up)

Olympic medal matches

Singles

Doubles

References

External links
 
 

1998 births
Living people
Brazilian male tennis players
Wimbledon junior champions
Sportspeople from Rio Grande do Sul
Tennis players at the 2014 Summer Youth Olympics
Tennis players at the 2015 Pan American Games
Youth Olympic gold medalists for Brazil
Grand Slam (tennis) champions in boys' doubles
Pan American Games competitors for Brazil